Herbert Knaup (born 23 March 1956) is a German film and television actor. He is perhaps best-known to international audiences for his supporting roles in Run Lola Run (1998) and The Lives of Others (2006).

Selected filmography

 Coda (1978, Short)
 Jaipur Junction (1982) .... Tommy
 Waller's Last Trip (1989) .... Waller (jung)
  (1994) .... Karl Simon
  (1994, TV film) .... Paul Hansen
 Brother of Sleep (1995) .... Cantor Goller / Choirmaster Goller
 Warshots (1996) .... Jan Loy
 Father's Day (1996) .... Thomas
  (1997, TV film) .... Kamphausen
 Run Lola Run (1998) .... Vater
 Blind Date - Flirt mit Folgen (1998) .... Markus
 Jimmy the Kid (1998) .... Dortmunder
 Fever (1998) .... Doermer
  (1999) .... Johann Wolfgang von Goethe
 Our Island in the South Pacific (1999) .... Albert
 Ne günstige Gelegenheit (1999) .... Lorenz Kellermann
 Ordinary Decent Criminal (2000) .... De Heer
 Marlene (2000) .... Rudolf Sieber
 Nuremberg (2000, TV Mini-Series) .... Albert Speer
 Anna's Summer (2001) .... Max Feldmann
 Nowhere in Africa (2001) .... Walter Redlich (voice)
 Deseo (2002) .... Bremen
 Ganz und gar (2003) .... Manfred
 Anatomy 2 (2003) .... Prof. Charles Müller-LaRousse
 Distant Lights (2003) .... Klaus Fengler
 Angst (2003) .... Wolfgang
 Hamlet_X (2003) .... Laertes
 Agnes and His Brothers (2004) .... Werner Tschirner
  (2004) .... Paul
 Atomised (2006) .... Sollers
 The Lives of Others (2006) .... Gregor Hessenstein
  (2006, TV film) .... Kapitän Ludwig Lewerenz
 Crusade in Jeans (2006) .... Carlo Bennatti
 Du bist nicht allein (2007) .... Kurt Wellinek
  (2007) .... Giselher
  (2008) .... Erzengel Michael
 This Is Love (2009) .... Dominik
 Sisi (2009, TV Movie) .... Herzog Max
 Kluftinger (2009–2016, TV series, 5 episodes) .... Kluftinger
 Jerry Cotton (2010) .... Mr. High
 Bon Appétit (2010) .... Thomas
  (2010, TV film) .... Adolf Eichmann
  (2011) .... Rainer Berg
 In Darkness (2011) .... Ignacy Chiger
  (2011, TV Movie) .... Erwin Bockelmann
 Hotel Desire (2011, Short) .... Hoteldirektor
  (2012, TV Movie) .... Bürgermeister
 Schutzengel (2012) .... Henri Brietner
 Move (2012) .... Vater Dina
 Das Kleine Gespenst (2013) .... Uhrmachermeister Zifferle
 Therapy Crashers (2014) .... Georg Trautmann
  (2015, TV film) .... Moritz Hollstein
  (since 2015, TV series, 62 episodes) .... Markus Gellert
  (2016) .... Narrator
 Eine Hochzeit platzt selten allein (2019) .... Oliver Wackernagel
  (2022) .... Robert

References

External links

1956 births
Living people
People from Sonthofen
German male film actors
German male television actors
20th-century German male actors